Jimmie Ronald Schaffer (born April 5, 1936, at Limeport, Pennsylvania) is an American former Major League Baseball catcher with an eight-year career from 1961 to 1968.  He played for the St. Louis Cardinals, Chicago Cubs, New York Mets, Philadelphia Phillies and Cincinnati Reds all of the National League and the Chicago White Sox of the American League.

Early life and education
Schaffer attended Coopersburg High School in Coopersburg, Pennsylvania, graduating in 1954.

Major League Baseball

Playing career
He was signed as an amateur free agent by the St. Louis Cardinals in 1955 and spent six seasons in the minor leagues before making his major league debut at age 25 on May 20, 1961. In that game, he started at catcher and batted eighth for the Cardinals, and in his first major league at bat, he recorded his first career major league hit, a third-inning single off the Cubs' Dick Ellsworth in a 1-0 loss.

In his major league career, Schaffer played in 304 games with 11 home runs, 56 runs batted in and a .223 batting average.

Coaching career
Schaffer also managed in the Baltimore Orioles' farm system, spent one season (1978) as the bullpen coach of the Texas Rangers, and played a similar role for the Kansas City Royals from 1980 to 1988, serving on the Royals' 1980 AL champion and 1985 world champion coaching staffs.

After retiring from coaching professional baseball in 1989, Schaffer returned to live in his hometown of Limeport, Pennsylvania. He and his wife Jeanne have five adult children and a 12-year-old grandson.

References

External links

1936 births
Living people
Baseball players from Pennsylvania
Chicago Cubs players
Chicago White Sox players
Cincinnati Reds players
Decatur Commodores players
Indianapolis Indians players
Kansas City Royals coaches
Major League Baseball catchers
Major League Baseball bullpen coaches
New York Mets players
Omaha Cardinals players
People from Coopersburg, Pennsylvania
Philadelphia Phillies players
Portland Beavers players
Rochester Red Wings players
San Diego Padres (minor league) players
Southern Lehigh High School alumni
Spokane Indians players
Sportspeople from Lehigh County, Pennsylvania
St. Louis Cardinals players
Texas Rangers coaches
Tulsa Oilers (baseball) players
Winnipeg Goldeyes players
Winston-Salem Red Birds players